Treaty of Fontainebleau may refer to:
Treaty of Fontainebleau (1631), a treaty between Bavaria and France during the Thirty Years' War
Treaty of Fontainebleau (1661), a treaty between France and the Swedish Empire for support of the French choice for King of Poland
Treaty of Fontainebleau (1679), a treaty between Denmark–Norway and Sweden during the Scanian War
Treaty of Fontainebleau (1743), a treaty between France and Spain that established the second Bourbon Family Compact
Treaty of Fontainebleau (1745), a between France and England that established a military alliance
Treaty of Fontainebleau (1762), an agreement between France and Spain that ceded the colony of Louisiana to Spain
Treaty of Fontainebleau (1785), a treaty between the Dutch Republic and the Holy Roman Empire regarding the Scheldt Estuary
Treaty of Fontainebleau (October 1807), a treaty between Spain and France about the occupation of Portugal
Treaty of Fontainebleau (October 1807) between France and Denmark-Norway
Treaty of Fontainebleau (November 1807), a treaty between France and the Kingdom of Holland in which France annexed Flushing, and Holland received East Frisia in compensation
Treaty of Fontainebleau (1814), a treaty that exiled Napoleon Bonaparte as the Emperor of Elba

See also
 Edict of Fontainebleau (1685), the Revocation of the Edict of Nantes